Wila Kunka (Aymara wila blood, blood red, kunka throat, also spelled Wila Cunca) is a mountain in the Apolobamba mountain range in Bolivia, about  high. It is situated in the La Paz Department, Bautista Saavedra Province, Curva Municipality. Wila Kunka lies south of the mountains Ulla Qhaya and Iskillani.

References 

Mountains of La Paz Department (Bolivia)